29th NSFC Awards
January 3, 1996

Best Film: 
 Babe 
The 30th National Society of Film Critics Awards, given on 3 January 1996, honored the best filmmaking of 1995.

Winners

Best Picture 
1. Babe
2. Crumb
3. Safe

Best Director 
1. Mike Figgis – Leaving Las Vegas
2. Todd Haynes – Safe
3. Walter Hill – Wild Bill

Best Actor 
1. Nicolas Cage – Leaving Las Vegas
2. Sean Penn – Dead Man Walking
3. Jeff Bridges – Wild Bill
3. Morgan Freeman – Seven

Best Actress 
1. Elisabeth Shue – Leaving Las Vegas
2. Jennifer Jason Leigh – Georgia
3. Meryl Streep – The Bridges of Madison County

Best Supporting Actor 
1. Don Cheadle – Devil in a Blue Dress
2. Kevin Spacey – Seven, The Usual Suspects, Swimming with Sharks and Outbreak
3. Delroy Lindo – Clockers and Get Shorty

Best Supporting Actress 
1. Joan Allen – Nixon
2. Mira Sorvino – Mighty Aphrodite
3. Illeana Douglas – To Die For

Best Screenplay 
1. Amy Heckerling – Clueless
2. André Téchiné, Gilles Taurand and Olivier Massart – Wild Reeds (Les roseaux sauvages)
3. Todd Haynes – Safe

Best Cinematography 
Tak Fujimoto – Devil in a Blue Dress

Best Foreign Language Film 
1. Wild Reeds (Les roseaux sauvages)
2. Lamerica
3. Through the Olive Trees (Zire darakhatan zeyton)

Best Documentary 
Crumb

Experimental Film 
Latcho Drom

Special Archival Prize 
I Am Cuba (Soy Cuba)

References

External links
Past Awards

1995
National Society of Film Critics Awards
National Society of Film Critics Awards
National Society of Film Critics Awards